Soltanabad (also Romanized as Solţānābād; also known as Sultānābād) is a village in Dehqanan Rural District, in the Central District of Kharameh County, Fars Province, Iran. At the 2006 census, its population was 2,082, in 506 families.

References 

Populated places in Kharameh County